Romanica Olomucensia is a peer-reviewed half-yearly academic journal published by the Palacký University since 2008, as a continuation of Acta Universitatis Palackianae Olomucensis: Facultas Philosophica: Philologica: Romanica Olomucensia (1973–2007). It covers all aspects of Romance language linguistics, literature, history and culture.

The main aim of the journal, as outlined in its website, is «to create a bridge between the long-established Central European research tradition in these fields and specialists from Romance-language countries, especially in Europe, but also in America and Africa»

Its current editor-in-chief is Enrique Gutierrez Rubio (Palacký University). Among the members of the Editorial board are such relevant scholars as Massimo Fusillo, Brad Epps, Michele Loporcaro, Mario Martín Gijón e Philippe Monneret.

The official language of the journal is English; however, RO hosts papers in French, Italian, Portuguese, and Spanish. The published papers are available to a free access through the website Dialnet.

References

External links 
 
 Free Access to RO since 2013

See also 

 Olomouc
 Palacký University
 Philippe Monneret

Literary magazines published in the Czech Republic
Linguistics journals
Publications established in 2008
French-language journals
Italian-language journals
Portuguese-language journals
Spanish-language journals